The Serbian men's university basketball team ( / Muška univerzitetska košarkaška reprezentacija Srbije) is the men's basketball team, administered by Basketball Federation of Serbia, that represents Serbia in the Summer Universiade men's basketball tournament.

The university team competed as FR Yugoslavia from 1993 to 2001, and as Serbia and Montenegro from 2003 to 2005.

History

Competitive record

Representing Yugoslavia / Serbia and Montenegro

Representing Serbia

Coaches

FR Yugoslavia / Serbia and Montenegro

Serbia

Past rosters

Representing Yugoslavia / Serbia and Montenegro

Representing Serbia

See also
 Serbia at the 2011 Summer Universiade
 Serbia at the 2013 Summer Universiade
 2009 Summer Universiade
 Serbia men's national under-20 basketball team
 Serbia men's national under-19 basketball team
 Serbia men's national under-18 basketball team
 Serbia men's national under-17 basketball team
 Serbia men's national under-16 basketball team

References

External links
 Basketball Federation of Serbia

U
Serbia at the Summer Universiade